Roslagskulla IF is a Swedish football club located in Åkersberga.

Background
Roslagskulla IF currently plays in Division 4 Stockholm Norra which is the sixth tier of Swedish football. They play their home matches at the Lötvallen in Åkersberga.

The club is affiliated to Stockholms Fotbollförbund.

Season to season

Footnotes

External links
 Roslagskulla IF – Official website

Football clubs in Stockholm
1933 establishments in Sweden